Charles Ayre may refer to:

 Charles R. Ayre (1819–1889), English-born merchant and political figure in Newfoundland
 Charles Arthur Ayre (1890–1974), English-born merchant, civil official and political figure in Saskatchewan